El Socialista Manchego was a weekly newspaper published from Alcázar de Cervantes, Spain from 1932 to 1938. It was published by the local branches of Spanish Socialist Workers' Party and Unión General de Trabajadores. Amongst the directors of El Socialista Manchego were Teodoro Vizcaino, Manuel Andújar Vela and Francisco Fernández. El Socialista Manchego disappeared in late 1938.

References

1932 establishments in Spain
1938 disestablishments in Spain
Defunct newspapers published in Spain
Defunct weekly newspapers
Publications established in 1932
Publications disestablished in 1938
Spanish-language newspapers
Socialist newspapers
Spanish Socialist Workers' Party